Deer Lake Water Aerodrome, formerly , was an airport located on Deer Lake, Ontario, Canada.

See also
Deer Lake Airport
Deer Lake/Keyamawun Water Aerodrome

References

Defunct seaplane bases in Ontario